Aage Torgensen (17 April 1900 – 28 May 1932) was a Danish wrestler. He competed at the 1920 and 1924 Summer Olympics.

References

External links
 

1900 births
1932 deaths
Olympic wrestlers of Denmark
Wrestlers at the 1920 Summer Olympics
Wrestlers at the 1924 Summer Olympics
Danish male sport wrestlers
Sportspeople from Aarhus